Maximilien II de Hénin, 5th Count of Bossu (1580-1625) was a noble lord.

Family 
Maxillien was the son of Jacques de Hénin, Marquess of la Veere, brother of Maximilien de Hénin, 3rd Count of Bossu and Marie of Hanaert, Baronnes of Liedekercke. He became the brother-in-law of Íñigo de Borja and Luis de Velasco y Velasco, 2nd Count of Salazar. In 1605 he married Alexandrin-Françoise of Gavre, daughter of Charles of Gavre, count of Frezin. One of his descendants was Cardinal Thomas d'Alsace.

Titles 
 5th Count of Bossu
 Marquess of Veer
 Baron of Liedekercke
 Viscount of Lombeecque
 Grand baillif of Ghent and Aalst.

Career 

He was member of the court of Archduke Leopold, governor of the City of Bethune, Belgium, and colonel in the artillery regiment. He became a knight of the Golden Fleece in 1628. He died in Liedekerke Castle and is buried in the Mausoleum of Boussu. On his tomb he is depicted kneeling in front of the Virgin Mary. This Renaissance artwork has been placed on the list of major heritage of Wallonia, and is considered one of the finest examples in Belgium.

Books 
 Fourez, Lucien et Dubuisson, Pierre, Deux chapelles uniques en Hainaut : Les chapelles funéraires de Howardries et Boussu, dans Revue belge d'Archéologie et d'Histoire de l'Art, XXIV, 1955, 3-4, pp. 165–217.

References

Hénin-Liétard
Knights of the Golden Fleece